Moose Lake Township is the name of some places in the U.S. state of Minnesota:

Moose Lake Township, Beltrami County, Minnesota
Moose Lake Township, Carlton County, Minnesota
Moose Lake Township, Cass County, Minnesota

See also

Moose Lake (disambiguation)

Minnesota township disambiguation pages